Light On My Path is Amy Holland's fourth studio album, and features chorus vocals by her husband Michael McDonald, and her son Dylan McDonald is also doing chorus here. She also sings a duet with her husband, "Prove That by Me".

The album was produced by Fred Mollin.

Track listing

Personnel
Amy Holland - vocals 
Pat Coil - piano, synthesizer  
Larry Beaird - acoustic guitars, mandolin 
Kerry Marx - electric guitars, acoustic guitars 
Bernie Chiaravalle - acoustic guitars 
Greg Morrow - drums, percussion 
Larry Paxton - bass, upright bass 
Stuart Duncan - fiddle, mandolin 
Jeff Taylor - accordion 
Jim Hoke - saxophone 
Steve Herman - trumpet
Fred Mollin - percussion, synthesizer
Troy Johnson, Perry Coleman, Jaime Babbitt, Maureen Murphy, Dylan McDonald, Michael McDonald, Joe Williams, David Crosby, David Pack, Kevin Whalum - backing vocals

2016 albums
Amy Holland albums